The Canadian Veterinary Medical Association ( CVMA; , ACMV), founded in 1876, provides leadership on national veterinary issues, advocates for animal welfare, and works to encourage life balance in veterinary professionals.

The CVMA publishes two scientific journals: the Canadian Journal of Veterinary Research, a peer-reviewed quarterly publication available online focusing on comparative and veterinary medicine, as well as the Canadian Veterinary Journal, a peer-reviewed monthly publication, focusing on scientific articles, regular columns, news, and information about new products.

The CVMA also publishes information about pet care for the public.

Veterinary students in Canada are automatically members of the CVMA and are referred to as Students of the CVMA (SCVMA) (ÉACMV). Each of Canada's five veterinary schools has a student representative who sits on the CVMA's Student committee. Veterinary students can attend an annual symposium in veterinary medicine including lectures and labs. Students can also apply for CVMA scholarships.

While veterinary schools in Canada are accredited by the Council on Education of the American Veterinary Medical Association, licensing exams for Canadian veterinary students are administered by the National Examination Board of the CVMA.

Position statements 

As part of CVMA's leadership on veterinary issues, they publish official position statements of national and international veterinary interest intended to serve as guidelines for veterinarians across the country as well as educate the public on the veterinary profession's opinion on various topics. The CVMA has 13 general position statements and 36 animal welfare position statements.

Vaccination
A recent increase in preventable infectious disease in pets has been seen in conjunction with a decrease in vaccinations. The CVMA supports vaccination of animals as preventative medicine to reduce disease risk. Despite this stance, there has been some controversy that veterinarians may be over-vaccinating pets; in response to this criticism, the CVMA maintains that research on longevity of vaccine coverage remains controversial, and vaccination schedules should be developed on an individual basis, depending on exposure risk.

On the issue of the northward migration of the West Nile virus, according to the Canadian Veterinary Medical Association - BC chapter's Dr. John Twidale, chair of the equine committee, stated that though the West Nile virus has been in British Columbia for five years, 2014 saw the first two cases of West Nile virus in two horses in Cache Creek and Ashcroft, and warned horse owners to get their animals vaccinated.

Cosmetic body alterations 
The January 2014 position statement reads:

Provincial veterinary associations had been addressing ear cropping and tail docking with various levels of bylaws or codes of practice banning veterinarians from these procedures.  Vets are banned from cropping ears in Manitoba, Saskatchewan, and British Columbia, which in November 2015, citing the position statement of the CVMA also decided to ban ear-cropping in dogs.

Following the 2014 CVMA statement, veterinary associations in three provinces have banned vets from performing any cosmetic surgeries: Québec (by the ), Nova Scotia, New Brunswick, while the government of Prince Edward Island has passed an Animal Welfare Act also banning all cosmetic surgeries. (Newfoundland was the earliest to ban these surgeries in 1978).

The CVMA also provides specific position statements for sheep, horses, and cattle.

Mental health of veterinarians
The CVMA Task Force on Member Wellness (2010) showed 19% of Canadian veterinarians had seriously contemplated suicide, confirming conclusions of a 2010 British study which found that the suicide rate among veterinarians is four times that of the general population and twice that of other healthcare professions.

Work with public health concerns 
With increasing global concern over development of antimicrobial resistance, the CVMA has taken an active role in Canada on the responsible use of antimicrobials. The CVMA has urged the government for further regulatory changes to provide increased veterinary oversight of antibiotic use in Canada. In 2015, the CVMA revised their statement to include a position on use of antimicrobials of high importance in human medicine (VDD Category I to III), stating they should only be used under veterinary oversight with a veterinary prescription. The CVMA, in conjunction with Health Canada and other partner organizations, developed a Therapeutic Decision Cascade for Animal and Public Safety. This document is intended to assist veterinarians in prescribing drugs, including antimicrobials, in a conscientious way for both animals and public health.

In 2014, the CMVA released their Antimicrobial Smartvet App that guides veterinarians through prescribing appropriate antimicrobials for specific bacterial infections in dogs and cats.

In Canada two major concerns of ticks are Lyme disease and Rocky Mountain spotted fever (RMSF). With global warming ticks are found further north and according to the CMVA, pet owners should increase their awareness of ticks on their pets as the prevalence of diseases carried by ticks is on the increase. As the ticks often migrate via birds, pet owners must start their pet maintenance routines in early spring, as soon as the weather passes zero Celsius.

References

External links

College of Veterinarians of British Columbia
Alberta Veterinary Medical Association
Saskatchewan Veterinary Medical Association
Manitoba Veterinary Medical Association
College of Veterinarians of Ontario
Ordre des médecins vétérinaires du Québec (College of Veterinary Surgeons of Quebec)
New Brunswick Veterinary Medical Association
Prince Edward Island Veterinary Medical Association
Nova Scotia Veterinary Medical Association

1876 establishments in Canada
Organizations established in 1876
Professional associations based in Canada
Veterinary medicine-related professional associations
Veterinary medicine in Canada